Fusion Festival is an annual music festival that takes place in Sefton Park, Liverpool in the United Kingdom. The event has been running since 2013 and was previously held at Cofton Park, Birmingham. In February 2016, the organisers announced the move to Liverpool on Capital FM.

Festival line-ups by year

Fusion Festival 2013

Fusion Festival 2014

Fusion Festival 2015
The 2015 edition of the festival expands to a 3-day festival and took place over the weekend of 28–30 August 2015. Justin Bieber was originally scheduled to headline Friday but withdrew and was replaced by Ed Sheeran.

Fusion Festival 2016
The 2016 edition saw the festival return to its two-day format and took place the weekend of 2–3 September.

The line up for 2016 was announced on Monday 4 April 2016 on Capital Radio, an official partner for the festival  who also announced the move of the Festival to Liverpool in February, 2016.

Fusion Festival 2017
The line up was originally scheduled to include Ella Henderson, who was replaced with Naughty Boy due to unforeseen circumstances and Louisa Johnson, who had to pull out due to illness.

Fusion Festival 2018
The 2018 edition saw the festival return to its two-day format and took place the weekend of 1–2 September.

Fusion Festival 2019
The 2019 edition saw the festival return to its two-day format and took place the weekend of 31 August & 1 September.

References

External links
 

Music festivals established in 2013
Pop music festivals in the United Kingdom